A Twenty20 International (T20I) is an international cricket match between two representative teams, each having T20I status, as determined by the International Cricket Council (ICC), and is played under the rules of Twenty20 cricket. The first such match was played between Australia and New Zealand on 17 February 2005 which Australia won by 44 runs at Eden Park. , 99 players have represented the Pakistan cricket team since their first match in 2006.

Pakistan played their first T20I match at the County Cricket Ground, Bristol, on 28 August 2006, against England, winning the match by five wickets.

The first list comprises all members of the Pakistan cricket team who have played at least one T20I match. It is initially arranged in the order in which each player won his first Twenty20 cap. Where more than one player won his first Twenty20 cap in the same match, those players are listed alphabetically by surname. The second list is initially arranged in the order in which each captain led the team for the first time.

Key

Players

''Statistics are corrected as of 13 November 2022.

T20I captains

Notes

References

External links

Pakistani Twenty20
Twenty20